Barnes was a local government district in north west Surrey from 1894 to 1965,  when its former area was absorbed into the London Borough of Richmond upon Thames.

History
Barnes was formed as an urban district in 1894 and became a municipal borough in 1932.

It contained the settlements of Barnes, Mortlake and East Sheen. It was part of the London postal district and Metropolitan Police District. The district was bounded by the County of London to the east, the River Thames and Middlesex to the north, and the Municipal Borough of Richmond to the west and south. The council met at 123 Mortlake High Street from 1895 until 1940, when the building was damaged by wartime bombing. After the war the council met at the Penryn Rooms in East Sheen.

In 1965 it was abolished and its former area became part of the London Borough of Richmond upon Thames.

Coat of arms 

The district's coat of arms, granted in 1932, was: Azure a saltire or between four ostrich feathers argent two oars in saltire proper that to the dexter bladed dark blue and that to the sinister bladed light blue.  The supporters were: Two griffins gules langued and armed azure, the dexter gorged with a collar flory or, charged with four crosses patée fitchy sable, the sinister gorged with a like collar charged with four lozenges, also sable. There was no crest.

The oars belonged to the boat race teams of the University of Oxford (dark blue) and the University of Cambridge (light blue), whose course on the River Thames ran along the borough's northern border, finishing at Mortlake. The feathers were derived from the Prince of Wales at the time of the grant (later Edward VIII and Duke of Windsor) whose birthplace, White Lodge, lay in the former borough. The griffins were derived from the arms of the Earls Spencer, who were once lords of the manor of Mortlake. The crosses came from the arms of the Archbishop of Canterbury, who also once held the same manor, and the lozenges from the arms of the Bishop of Southwark, in whose diocese the borough was situated.

The oars became part of the coat of arms of the London Borough of Richmond upon Thames, along with the red griffin supporters.

References

External links
 Barnes ... London's Latest Borough, 1932, British Pathe

Barnes, London
1894 establishments in England
1965 disestablishments in England
Districts abolished by the London Government Act 1963
Districts of England created by the Local Government Act 1894
East Sheen
History of the London Borough of Richmond upon Thames
History of Surrey
Mortlake, London
Municipal boroughs of England